"God is dead" is a widely quoted statement by German philosopher Friedrich Nietzsche.

God is dead may also refer to:
The Death of God, a 1961 book by Gabriel Vahanian
"The Death of God" (song), a single by Roy Harper
God is Dead (novel), the debut novel of American author Ron Currie Jr.
God Is Dead, volume 48 of the manga series Bleach
"God Is Dead", a song by The Smith Street Band from their 2020 album Don't Waste Your Anger
"God Is Dead?", a single by Black Sabbath
God Is Dead (comics), a series by Jonathan Hickman and Mike Costa

See also
Death of God theology
God's Not Dead (disambiguation)
Is God Dead?